Uyuni Municipality is the first municipal section of the Antonio Quijarro Province in the Potosí Department in Bolivia. Its seat is Uyuni.

Geography 
The municipality lies at the Uyuni salt flat.

Some of the highest mountains of the municipality are listed below:

 Jach'a Punta
 Jalsuri
 Janq'u Qullu
 Kuntur Ikiña
 Pirwani
 Sura Chata
 Warachi Qullu
 Wila Qullu

Subdivision 
The municipality consists of the following cantons: 
 Chacala
 Coroma
 Huanchaca
 Pulacayo
 Uyuni

The people 
The people are predominantly indigenous citizens of Quechua and Aymara descent.

References

External links 
Uyuni Municipality: population data and map

Municipalities of Potosí Department